Samuel Hurl (born April 26, 1990) is a retired professional Canadian football linebacker. He was drafted 12th overall by the Roughriders in the 2012 CFL Draft. He played CIS football for the Calgary Dinos. Hurl won the 101st Grey Cup Championship Game for the Saskatchewan Roughriders at home on November 24, 2013.

Professional career

Saskatchewan Roughriders
Hurl was drafted by the Saskatchewan Roughriders with the 12th pick in the 2012 CFL Draft. He signed with the Roughriders on May 31, 2012.

Winnipeg Blue Bombers
Upon entering free agency, Hurl signed with the Winnipeg Blue Bombers on February 10, 2015.

Saskatchewan Roughriders (II)
Hurl once again became a free agent in 2018 and was signed by the Roughriders on February 14, 2018.

References

External links
 Saskatchewan Roughriders bio 
 Winnipeg Blue Bombers bio 

1990 births
Living people
Canadian football linebackers
Canadian football people from Calgary
Players of Canadian football from Alberta
Saskatchewan Roughriders players
Winnipeg Blue Bombers players
Calgary Dinos football players